The Blue Dog Coalition (commonly known as the Blue Dogs or Blue Dog Democrats) is a caucus in the United States House of Representatives comprising centrist members from the Democratic Party. The caucus was founded as a group of conservative Democrats in 1995 in response to defeats in the 1994 elections. Historically, the Blue Dog Coalition has been fiscally and socially conservative, representing the center-right in the Democratic Party. The modern Blue Dog Coalition remains the most conservative grouping of Democrats in the House, broadly adopting socially liberal and fiscally conservative policies and promoting fiscal restraint. Blue Dogs are mostly elected in Republican-leaning districts.

The caucus currently has 8 members. The co-chairs of the Blue Dog Coalition for the 117th Congress were U.S. representatives Ed Case, Stephanie Murphy,and Tom O'Halleran. The chair of the Blue Dog PAC, the Coalition's political organization, was U.S. representative Kurt Schrader, who lost renomination in 2022.

Electoral results

House of Representatives

Overview and history 

The Blue Dog Coalition was formed in 1995 during the 104th Congress to give members from the Democratic Party representing conservative-leaning districts a unified voice after the Democrats' loss of Congress in the 1994 Republican Revolution.

The term "Blue Dog Democrat" is credited to Texas Democratic Representative Pete Geren (who later joined the George W. Bush administration). Geren opined that the members had been "choked blue" by Democrats on the left. It is related to the political term "Yellow Dog Democrat", a reference to Southern Democrats said to be 'so loyal they would even vote for a yellow dog before they would vote for any Republican'. The term also refers to the "Blue Dog" paintings of Cajun artist George Rodrigue of Lafayette, Louisiana as the original members of the coalition would regularly meet in the offices of Louisiana representatives Billy Tauzin and Jimmy Hayes, both of whom later joined the Republican Party – both also had Rodrigue's paintings on their walls. An additional explanation for the term cited by members is "when dogs are not let into the house, they stay outside in the cold and turn blue", a reference to the Blue Dogs' belief they had been left out of a party that they believed had shifted to the political left. At one time, first-term Blue Dogs were nicknamed 'Blue Pups'. Starting in the twenty-first century, the caucus began shifting its ideology and began adopting more socially liberal stances in order align more closely with mainstream Democratic Party political values.

Disputes within the Democratic Party 

In 2007, 15 Blue Dogs in safe seats rebelled, and refused to contribute party dues to the Democratic Congressional Campaign Committee. An additional 16 Blue Dogs did not pay any money to the DCCC, but were exempt from party-mandated contributions because they were top GOP targets for defeat in 2008. One reason for the party-dues boycott was contained in remarks made by Rep. Lynn Woolsey of California, encouraging leaders of anti-war groups to field primary challenges to any Democrat who did not vote to end the war in Iraq. Woolsey later stated that she was misunderstood, but the Blue Dogs continued the boycott. Donations to party congressional committees are an important source of funding for the party committees, permitting millions of dollars to be funneled back into close races.

Role in the passage of the ACA 

In the summer of 2009, The Economist newspaper said the following regarding the Blue Dog Coalition: "The debate over health care ... may be the pinnacle of the group's power so far." The Economist quoted Charlie Stenholm, a founding Blue Dog, as stating that "This is the first year for the new kennel in which their votes are really going to make a difference." In July 2009, Blue Dog members who were committee members of the House Energy and Commerce Committee successfully delayed the House vote on the Health Insurance Reform Bill (HR3200) until after the Summer Recess. It was during this recess that the term 'Obamacare' was first derisively adopted by Republicans on Capitol Hill It is widely proposed that Blue Dog opposition to the "public option" and this recess, with that summer's contentious Town Hall meetings, provided the healthcare law's Republican opponents the opportunity to attack and subsequently get the public option dropped from the original, pre-recess bill.
 
The Washington Post noted the most influential U.S. House of Representatives voting bloc was the conservative Democrat Blue Dog Coalition, having over 50 members.

Post-2010 decline 

The Blue Dog Coalition suffered serious losses in the 2010 midterm elections, losing over half of its seats to Republican challengers. Its members, who were roughly one quarter of the Democratic Party's caucus in the 111th Congress, accounted for half of the party's midterm election losses. Including retirements, Blue Dog numbers in the House were reduced from 59 members in 2009 to 26 members in 2011. Two of the Coalition's four leaders (Stephanie Herseth Sandlin and Baron Hill) failed to secure re-election.

The caucus shrank even more in the 2012 House of Representatives elections, decreasing in size from 27 to 14 members. Speculation ensued that the centrist New Democrat Coalition would fill the power vacuum created by the Blue Dog Coalition's decline. Opposition to the Patient Protection and Affordable Care Act and climate change legislation are believed to have contributed to the defeat of two conservative Democrats in the 2012 House elections in Pennsylvania by more liberal opponents.

In the 2016 elections, future Blue Dogs accounted for over half of the Democrats' gains in the House. In 2018, for the first time since 2006, the Democratic Congressional Campaign Committee partnered with the Blue Dog PAC (the Blue Dog Coalition's political organization) to recruit candidates in competitive districts across the country. After the 2018 House of Representatives elections, the caucus grew from 18 members to 24. All incumbents were re-elected and Rep. Kyrsten Sinema was elected to the U.S. Senate from Arizona. The caucus also added 11 new members who defeated Republican incumbents in the 2018 election in districts that had voted for Donald Trump in 2016. Congressional Democrats gained more seats than in any single election since the post-Watergate congressional elections.

Failed Renaming

In January 2023, at the start of the 118th congress, six of the expected 15 members of the caucus left after a failed attempt to rename the group to the Common Sense Coalition. Freshman representatives Don Davis and Wiley Nickel of North Carolina, who were expected to join the Blue Dogs, chose not to do so. The six members were:

California
 Lou Correa, Representative from CA-46

Georgia
 David Scott, Representative from GA-13

Hawaii
 Ed Case, Representative from HI-01

Illinois
 Brad Schneider, Representative from IL-10

New Jersey
 Mikie Sherrill, Representative from NJ-11

Virginia
 Abigail Spanberger, Representative from VA-07

As of March 2023, the caucus consists of 8 members, the lowest number in its history.

Ideology 
The Blue Dog Coalition is the most conservative grouping of Democrats in the House. It "advocates for fiscal responsibility, a strong national defense and bipartisan consensus rather than conflict with Republicans". It acts as a check on legislation that its members perceive to be too far to the right or to the left on the political spectrum. It broadly supports socially liberal and fiscally conservative policies and promoting fiscal restraint. The caucus has shifted left in recent years, adopting more liberal stances on social issues and aligning more closely with Democratic Party policies.

The Blue Dog Coalition is nonetheless often involved in searching for a compromise between liberal and conservative positions. Though its members have evolved on social issues over time, the group has never taken a position on social issues as a caucus. There is no mention of social issues in the official Blue Dog materials.

Membership 

In the early years of the caucus, the Blue Dogs were viewed by some as the political successors to Southern Democratic groups known such as the Boll Weevils or conservative coalition. The Boll Weevils may, in turn, be considered the descendants of the Dixiecrats and the "states' rights" Democrats of the 1940s through the 1960s, and even the Bourbon Democrats of the late 19th century.

The founding members of the Blue Dog Coalition were: Glen Browder and Bud Cramer of Alabama; Blanche Lincoln of Arkansas; Gary Condit of California; Nathan Deal of Georgia; William Lipinski of Illinois; Scotty Baesler of Kentucky; Billy Tauzin and Jimmy Hayes of Louisiana; Collin Peterson and David Minge of Minnesota; Michael Parker and Gene Taylor of Mississippi; Pat Danner of Missouri; William K. Brewster of Oklahoma; John S. Tanner of Tennessee; Ralph Hall, Charles Stenholm, Pete Geren and Greg Laughlin of Texas, Bill Orton of Utah; and Lewis F. Payne, Jr. and Owen Pickett of Virginia. Condit (Administration), Peterson (Policy) and Tanner (Communications) were co-chairs (Deal was initially the chair for Policy before he switched parties shortly after the caucus's founding). Browder headed the group's budget task force.

In January 2019, McClatchy reported that the Blue Dogs had changed from a coalition of "southern white men" to "a multi-regional, multicultural group"; at that time, two Blue Dogs were African-American, one was Vietnamese-American, one was Mexican-American, and only five came from Southern states.

As of the 118th Congress, the caucus included 8 members, its lowest number to date.

Co-chairs 
The co-chairs of the Blue Dog Coalition for the 117th Congress are U.S. Representatives Ed Case, Stephanie Murphy, and Tom O'Halleran. The chair of the Blue Dog PAC, the Coalition's political organization, is U.S. Representative Kurt Schrader. Rep. Murphy, a Vietnamese American, is the first woman of color to lead the Blue Dog Coalition in its history.

Current Members of the Blue Dog Coalition 
Alaska
 Mary Peltola, Representative from AK-At Large

California
 Jim Costa, Representative from CA-21
 Mike Thompson, Representative from CA-04

Georgia
 Sanford Bishop, Representative from GA-02

Maine
 Jared Golden, Representative from ME-02

New Jersey
 Josh Gottheimer, Representative from NJ-05

Texas
 Henry Cuellar, Representative from TX-28
  Vicente Gonzalez, Representative from TX-34

See also 
 Congressional Progressive Caucus
 Factions in the Democratic Party
 New Democrat Coalition
 Republican Main Street Partnership
 Republican Governance Group

Notes

References

External links 

 Right-Leaning "Blue Dogs" Lose Seats in 2010 Election– video report by Democracy Now!

Ideological caucuses of the United States Congress
Centrism in the United States
Centrist political advocacy groups in the United States
Democratic Party (United States) organizations
Factions in the Democratic Party (United States)
Political terminology of the United States